Aldo Misael Arellano Miranda (born 14 June 1995) is a Mexican professional footballer who plays as a midfielder for Sonora.

Career

Youth
Arellano joined the youth academy of  Querétaro in 2012. Which he than continued through Gallos Blancos Youth Academy successfully going through U-17 and U-20. Until finally reaching the first team, Jaime Lozano being the coach promoting Arellano to first team.

Querétaro F.C.
On February 25, 2017, Arellano made his competitive Liga MX debut ending in a 4–3 win against UNAM.

Honours
Querétaro
Supercopa MX: 2017

References

External links

Living people
1995 births
Association football midfielders
Querétaro F.C. footballers
Cimarrones de Sonora players
Liga MX players
Ascenso MX players
Liga Premier de México players
Footballers from the State of Mexico
People from Toluca
Mexican footballers